Jason Chue, better known as Wookie, is a UK garage musician. He scored a UK top 10 hit in 2000 with his song "Battle".

Biography
Chue's career began in 1991 as a producer for UK R&B/reggae artist Wayne Marshall, producing most of Marshall's debut album 90 Degrees and Rising in 1994. Shortly after, Chue became writer/producer for Soul II Soul at their studio, working with Jazzie B for several years. He would also go on to produce for Dynamite MC and Doom Man.

Chue has remixed tracks by Destiny's Child, Public Enemy and Nas, among others. In the late 1990s, the 'Wookie sound' became apparent in his bootleg mixes of songs by Whitney Houston, Brandy and Debelah Morgan.

One of the original innovators of UK garage, Wookie scored a huge underground club hit in 1999 with "Scrappy". Also in that year, he released his first official remix of the Gabrielle song "Sunshine", under the name 'Wookie'. Another hit remix was released in 2000 under the alias Exemen, of Sia's song "Little Man". Wookie scored his first UK top 10 hit single in 2000 with "Battle". Two of his other songs, "What's Going On" and "Back Up (To Me)" also made the UK charts. His self-titled debut album was also released in 2000.

Wookie has reproduced tracks for artists such as Jessie J, Rizzle Kicks, Sia, Justin Timberlake, Roll Deep, Ray Foxx, and many others.

In 2013, Wookie appeared alongside many other garage pioneers in a documentary exploring the legacy of UK garage, Rewind 4Ever: The History of UK Garage. Also in 2013, Wookie produced remixes of Disclosure's "Voices" and Eliza Doolittle's "Walking on Water". On 31 December 2013, Wookie together with Zed Bias headlined the Bruk Out party at the Big Chill House in Kings Cross, London.

Discography

Albums
2000: Wookie

Singles
1999: "Down on Me"/"Scrappy"
2000: "What's Going On" - UK #45
2000: "Battle" - UK #10
2000: "Get Enuff" (featuring Lain) - UK #80
2001: "Back Up (To Me)" (featuring Lain) - UK #38
2006: "Sunshine in the Rain" (featuring Lain)
2006: "Live On"
2007: "Do You Believe?" (featuring Xavier)
2008: "Falling Again"/"Gallium" (featuring NY)
2012: "2 Us" (with Rachel Collier)
2013: "The Hype" (featuring Eliza Doolittle)
2014: "Higher"  (featuring Zak Abel)

Remixes
2000: "Sunshine" (Wookie Main Mix) - Gabrielle
2000: "Little Man" (Exemen Remix) - Sia
2006: "Lean wit It, Rock wit It" (Exemen Master Mix) - Dem Franchize Boyz
2012: "Sparks" (Wookie Remix) - Cover Drive
2020: "Who Knew?" (Wookie Remix) - Disclosure and Mick Jenkins

Awards
MOBO nomination for Best Producer
Ericsson Award winner for Best Newcomer

References

External links

Living people
UK garage musicians
Black British DJs
DJs from London
English electronic musicians
Remixers
English record producers
English house musicians
Electronic dance music DJs
Year of birth missing (living people)